Natasha Sturges (born 30 June 1975) is an Australian-born windsurfer who competed in the 1996 Summer Olympics and the 2004 Summer Olympics.

Born in Sydney, Sturges represented Australia in the women's Mistral event and finished in ninth place in 1996. In 2004 she represented Great Britain in the same event and again finished ninth.

References 

1975 births
Living people
Female windsurfers
Australian female sailors (sport)
Australian windsurfers
Olympic sailors of Australia
Sailors at the 1996 Summer Olympics – Mistral One Design
Sailors at the 2004 Summer Olympics – Mistral One Design
Olympic sailors of Great Britain